Maura Higgins (born 25 November 1990) is an Irish television personality, presenter and model. She finished in fourth place on the fifth series of Love Island 2019. Since the show, she has collaborated with numerous fashion and makeup brands. She was a contestant on Dancing on Ice. Higgins has been a presenter on This Morning and hosted the Irish version of the reality television competition Glow Up.

Early life
Higgins was born in Ballymahon, County Longford to Sharon and Seamus Higgins. She has two sisters and a brother. A former pupil of Forgney N.S. She went to Ballymahon Vocational school. She studied to become a hairdresser and worked in a salon in Ballymahon for some time. Higgins also worked for Monster Energy. At the end of 2017, as a Monster girl, she travelled to Abu Dhabi for formula 1 finale and in 2018, she went viral with a video of her drifting a car for Monster Energy in Abu Dhabi to inspire women there to drive.

Prior to appearing on Love Island, she worked as a ring girl for several professional boxers, including Anthony Joshua. Higgins also appeared in the visuals of the 2017 hit song Get Low by Liam Payne.

Career
In 2019, Higgins entered the Love Island villa for its fifth series. She entered the villa on Day 10, reaching the final alongside Curtis Pritchard and finishing in fourth place. The same year she launched a makeup collection with makeup brand Inglot and began appearing regularly on This Morning, presenting an agony aunt segment. In 2020, Higgins appeared on the twelfth series of Dancing on Ice partnered with Alexander Demetriou. She was eliminated in week 7 after losing the skate-off to Libby Clegg.

She has appeared on celebrity game shows including Supermarket Sweep, Celebrity Juice, I'll Get This and The Wheel. In September 2021, it was announced that Higgins would be presenting the Irish version of Glow Up: Britain's Next Make-Up Star.

Personal life
Higgins was previously in a relationship with Strictly Come Dancing star Giovanni Pernice.

Filmography

References

Social media influencers
1990 births
Living people
People from County Longford
21st-century Irish women
20th-century Irish women
21st-century Irish people
Love Island (2015 TV series) contestants